is a Japanese actor. He is represented with Sis Company. His wife is actress Chihiro Otsuka.

Biography
Suzuki graduated from Seinan Gakuin High School and Aoyama Gakuin University Faculty of Business Department of Management. He joined athletics when he was in high school, and had experience running short distance races at the national Inter-High School Championships.

Suzuki greatly admired the actor Toshiyuki Nishida, and even took a leave from the university to enter the Seinenza acting school, the troupe Nishida belonged to. He later officially joined Seinenza Theater Company in 1997. He later left in 2004 after Nishida left the company. Suzuki continued by acting in television dramas.

In 2007 he played Yuji Fukunaga in Liar Game and gained popularity due to his lines. Suzuki's character in the series is also known for his mushroom hair, black eyeglasses, loud speech, abuse of others, and the intensity of his character. Suzuki commented that the character was tiring. Perhaps because of the popularity of that character, he later performed a similar role in Flight Panic.

In his private life Suzuki dated Seven Detectives co-star Chihiro Otsuka in July 2015 and they later married on 7 October.

Filmography

TV drama

Films

Japanese dub

Advertisements

References

External links
 

Actors from Fukuoka Prefecture
Japanese male sprinters
Japanese male film actors
Japanese male stage actors
Japanese male television actors
Aoyama Gakuin University alumni
People from Kitakyushu
1974 births
Living people
20th-century Japanese male actors
21st-century Japanese male actors